The E. V. Murphree Award is an annual award presented by the American Chemical Society for outstanding research of a theoretical or experimental nature in the fields of industrial chemistry or chemical engineering. The award comes with a $5000 prize, a certificate, and up to $1000 in travel expenses paid.

The award is named after Eger V. Murphree, the American chemist best known for his co-invention of the process of fluid catalytic cracking.

Recipients 
Source: American Chemical Society

See also

 List of chemistry awards

References

Awards of the American Chemical Society
Awards established in 1957